F-IRE Collective is a creative music community. The Collective also has a record label.

In 2004, F-IRE Collective won the BBC Jazz Award for Innovation.

Details
F-IRE (Fellowship for Integrated Rhythmic Expression) was named later in 1998 and came to encompass a community of artists whose outlook stretched beyond 'music alone'. Dance, poetry, film and other modes of creative expression were as much a part of their artistic conception as the sound they produced. F-IRE members attempt to cultivate their own directions and transcend categorical boundaries, circus or electronica, free improvisation or classical composition.

F-IRE has three main communal objectives: to sustain the creative lives of their members and the surrounding community; to ensure that their creativity functions well inside the wider community; to share their knowledge and opportunities. The collective's success is built on the quality of its work in education, performance and recording. Until 2005 these three principal spheres of activity proceeded without funding.

Active members

Former members

Bands

See also
 List of record labels

References

External links

English record labels
English jazz ensembles
Jazz record labels
Musical collectives
Musical groups established in 1998